A shearwater is a long-winged seabird in the petrel family.

Shearwater may also refer to:

Places
 Shearwater, Tasmania, Australia
 Shearwater, British Columbia, Canada
 Shearwater, Nova Scotia, Canada
 CFB Shearwater, a military base
 Shearwater Bay, Namibia
 Shearwater (lake), Wiltshire, UK

Ships
 , series of Royal Navy ships
 , Royal Canadian Navy
 , series of U.S. Navy ships
 USCGC Shearwater, a U.S. Coast Guard Marine Protector class coastal patrol boat
 , a 1929 wooden schooner in New York City
 Shearwater I, an catamaran developed in England c. 1949-1950
 Shearwater III, a catamaran developed in England in the 1950s

Other
 Shearwater, The Mullumbimby Steiner School, New South Wales, Australia
 Shearwater (album), 1972 album by Martin Carthy
 Shearwater (band), indie rock band from Austin, Texas, USA
 Shearwater Research, a Canadian manufacturer of dive computers and rebreather electronics for technical diving
Shearwater GeoServices, a Norwegian marine geophysical company; see Polarcus

See also 
 Sheerwater